The Dunn-Watkins House, located on Danville Rd./Kentucky Route 52 northwest of Lancaster in Garrard County, Kentucky, was listed on the National Register of Historic Places in 1985.

It is a two-story four-bay brick house with some elements of Italianate style, including rounded arch windows.  It has a central chimney and a rear ell.

It has also been known as Watkins Farm.

References

Houses on the National Register of Historic Places in Kentucky
Italianate architecture in Kentucky
Houses in Garrard County, Kentucky
National Register of Historic Places in Garrard County, Kentucky
Farms on the National Register of Historic Places in Kentucky